This is a list of Billboard magazine's Top Hot 100 songs of 1991.

See also
1991 in music
List of Billboard Hot 100 number-one singles of 1991
List of Billboard Hot 100 top-ten singles in 1991

References

1991 record charts
Billboard charts